Visionary Underground are a technology driven, audio-visual collective from London. At VU's core, DJ Feelfree's distinctive, driving beats are laced with UK hip hop, ragga, soul, dub, and Asian flava's and accompanied by VJ Coco's vibrant, interactive visuals. Damion Mulrain's soaring vocals are a perfect counterpoint to the fluid delivery of rapper Duane Flames. Collectively, they ably demonstrate that they have a finger on the pulse of the nation's psyche. Their live performances are delivered with energy and passion.

The debut album "Keep The Grime On" saw many guest collaborations. The second album "Fired Up" reverts to a more traditional format of featuring mainly only band members. Currently the third album is being written. The first single to come off that album is "Get The Beers In"

History
Reflecting Visionary Underground's independent nature, VU Recordings (their own label) was created to overcome a lack of opportunity for the group in the music industry. 
 --Visionary Underground

Prior to the release of "Keep The Grime On", VU Recordings released four 12" vinyl singles and one CD/vinyl single. All have been well received by the underground club market especially Eye Of The Storm which was picked up by MTV's Party Hard. Also Militant 24-7 taken from KTGO was chosen as TV title music for BBC 2s Asian arts and culture programme; Desi DNA, whilst a selection of VU tracks have also seen their way onto a variety of compilation albums including FabricLive15 (mixed by Nitin Sawhney) and Peace Not War Vol II. Nov 2006 saw the release of Dr Das's solo debut album "Emergency Basslines"

A sign of the times, VU have embraced Internet technology and acknowledge it as a powerful tool that can help you reach people all over the world. Since their conception, they have always given away many MP3 downloads from the VU site.

In an interview for SOAS Radio in 2017, Coco Das stated that nowadays they prefer to describe themselves as audio-visual collective and instead a drum ’n’ bass/breakbeat band. In the same interview, Coco Das discuss a lot about their history and track production notes.

Lineup
Founders 
FeelFree (DJ/Producer)
Coco (VJ/Visual Artist)
Damion Mulrain (Vocalist/Lyricist)
Duane Flames (Rap/Lyricist)
Featured Artists
Dr Das (founder member and formerly of Asian Dub Foundation) (live bass)
bobby "sox" demers (live jungle/breakbeat drummer)
Yap (Pink Punk)
Asian Dub Foundation ft Sinéad O'Connor
Nitin Sawhney
Aref Durvesh (tabla maestro)
Chandru (bollywoodstrings.com)
Pandit Dinesh (tabla and percussion guru
MC Navigator (of Freestylers fame
Sonia Mehta (Indian vocalist).

Discography

References

External links
 Visionary Underground official site
 Visionary Underground's Myspace
 To hear all 11 tracks from FIRED UP
 Jurg's ADF discography and related news

English electronic music groups
Musical groups from London